Artyom Olegovich Shumansky (born 25 November 2004) is a Belarusian professional footballer who plays for Aris Limassol.

Honours
BATE Borisov
Belarusian Super Cup winner: 2022

References

External links 
 
 

2004 births
Living people
Sportspeople from Vitebsk
Belarusian footballers
Association football forwards
Belarusian expatriate footballers
Expatriate footballers in Cyprus
FC BATE Borisov players
Aris Limassol FC players